Muncie Mall is an enclosed shopping mall in Muncie, Indiana. Opened in 1970, it was developed by Melvin Simon & Associates, now known as Simon Property Group. The mall's original anchor stores were W. T. Grant, Britt's, Sears, and Ball Stores. In 2020 the mall had no anchor stores, although it continued to have over 30 inline tenants. Its anchor stores as they closed were JCPenney, Macy's, Carson's, and Sears. In 2021 the former Macy's building was bought by a discount store called Buyers Market. The mall is owned and managed by the Woodmont Company.

History

Stores 

Muncie Mall opened in 1970 with Britt's, W. T. Grant, and Sears as its anchor stores. Other major tenants upon opening included a National Tea supermarket and Osco Drug. Britt's later became L. S. Ayres and Grants later became J. C. Penney, respectively. Another major tenant was Ball Stores, which later became Elder-Beerman.

In 1997, after L.S. Ayres vacated the central anchor spot for a new store in the mall, the former Ayres building became a new Elder-Beerman store. Elder-Beerman continued to operate a home goods store within the former Ball Stores. L.S. Ayres' newer store became Macy's in 2006. Books-A-Million opened its fourth Indiana store at the mall in the former Osco Drug in 2006. Old Navy, which replaced the Elder-Beerman home store, closed in 2010.

The discount Movie Theater Closed in the Early 2000s, it has since been walled over and used for storage.

Elder-Beerman became Carson's in 2012. On April 18, 2018, Carson's announced that its store would be closing as a result of liquidation of their parent company, Bon-Ton. The store closed on August 31, 2018. On May 31, 2018, Sears announced that they would also be closing as part of a plan to close 72 stores nationwide. Sears closed in September 2018. On May 31, 2019, it was announced that the owner of the mall will be returning the mall to the bank. On January 7, 2020, Macy's announced that they would be closing as part of a plan to close 125 stores nationwide. The store was set to close in April 2020, but due to the COVID-19 pandemic, it closed in March along with the temporary closure of the mall.

In 2019 the former Carson's was used for a Once a month flea market, which later closed. In 2021 Spirit Halloween occupied the space. Neither of them used the second floor.

On June 4, 2020, JCPenney announced that it would be closing in October 2020 as part of a plan to close 154 stores nationwide, which will leave the mall without any anchor stores. The mall had seventeen permanently closed stores and restaurants as of July 2020.

On June 18, 2021, Buyers Market ( a discount store ) bought and opened in the former Macy's.

In 2022 Spirit Halloween occupied the former Carson’s, they have been the only tenant in the space since they last used it in 2021. They Did not use the mall entrance either years.

Ownership 
Muncie Mall was owned and operated by Simon Property Group prior to being spun off, along with some other Simon-owned properties, into newly formed Washington Prime Group (WPG) in 2014. In 2020, WPG CEO Louis G. Conforti referred to Muncie Mall as one of the company's "crappiest assets". WPG CFO Mark E. Yale announced the company's intention to default on mortgage loans secured by seventeen of the company's malls, including Muncie Mall, thus transitioning these malls to the company's lenders. The mall served as collateral for a $33.1 million loan from JPMBB Commercial Mortgage Securities Trust to WPG. The mall was closed temporarily at the start of the coronavirus outbreak. A receiver was appointed to manage and lease the mall on April 14, and the mall reopened under new management by the Woodmont Company on May 18.

References

External links
Muncie Mall

Shopping malls established in 1970
Shopping malls in Indiana
Tourist attractions in Muncie, Indiana
Buildings and structures in Muncie, Indiana